This is a list of mayors, or persons holding the equivalent office, of Mobile, Alabama, United States.

When Mobile came into the United States, it operated under a government system where the chief executive was called "President"

Presidents of Mobile

Mayors of Mobile

List of Mayors of Mobile between 1911 and 1985 (President of the City Commission)

From 1911 to 1985, Mobile was governed by a three-member city commission.  The office of Mayor of Mobile rotated between the members of the commission and was the title given to the President of the Commission.  The last directly elected mayor before the institution of the commission was Patrick J. Lyons.  He was the 40th mayor of Mobile.  Lyons would go on to be elected to the City Commission where he would serve as mayor several more times.  After several commissioners had faced corruption indictments and popular support grew for discarding the old commission system, Mobile restored direct elections in 1985, electing Arthur Outlaw as their first directly elected mayor since 1911.  The numbers listed correspond to their order within the overall list of the mayors of Mobile, not their order in presiding over the commission.

Chiefs of Staff to the Mayor

See also
 Timeline of Mobile, Alabama

References

Sources
http://www.worldstatesmen.org/US_Mayors2.html#Mobile

Mobile, Alabama